Vladimir (Albanian: Katërkollë) is a village in the municipality of Ulcinj, Montenegro.

Demographics
According to Montenegro's 2011 census, the population of Vladimir is 99.6% ethnically Albanian. Moreover, 99.2% of the town's population considers Albanian to be their mother tongue. Approximately 99.5% of the population follow Islam.

Notes
Montenegrin Cyrillic spelling
Albanian name

References

Populated places in Ulcinj Municipality
Albanian communities in Montenegro